Thomas Stanford may refer to:

 Thomas Stanford (film editor) (1924–2017), Academy Award winning film editor
 Thomas Stanford (MP) for Stafford
 Thomas C. Stanford (1865–1945), legislator
 Thomas Welton Stanford (1832–1918), American-born Australian businessman, spiritualist and philanthropist

See also
 Tom Stanford (1860–?), British footballer